Zucker, Abrahams and Zucker (abbreviated to ZAZ) were an American comedy filmmaking trio consisting of Jim Abrahams and brothers David and Jerry Zucker who specialized in writing slapstick comedy films during the 1980s.

History
David Zucker, Jim Abrahams and Jerry Zucker knew each other during their childhood years, growing up in Shorewood, Wisconsin, and attending Shorewood High School which is sometimes referenced in their work. While attending the University of Wisconsin–Madison, the trio founded a small theater known as The Kentucky Fried Theater in 1971 which led to their sketch comedy film The Kentucky Fried Movie in 1977.

This was followed by the trio's breakout hit Airplane! in 1980, which remains a revered comedic milestone. Subsequent collaborations include Top Secret!, Ruthless People, and The Naked Gun. All of their projects relied heavily on parodies, visual gags and breaking of the fourth wall, and established a strong 1980s cult following. The notable stylistic exception is Ruthless People, a more traditional farce that was directed by the trio but unlike their other productions, not written by them. The trio's status as a three-person team of co-directors is highly unusual, although some of their later projects were directed by David Zucker working solo and with Jerry Zucker and Abrahams credited only as producers and/or writers.

The trio split up in the 1990s for fiscal and creative reasons, stating that there were "too many guys sitting in the same chair". They also said that they had been treated unfairly by the studios that produced their films, claiming that they failed to see any profits from Ruthless People. Nevertheless, the three still maintain a close friendship.

Members of the team have often collaborated with writer Pat Proft.

Filmography

The below chart shows which films member(s) of the trio have directed or been a writer for, plus the involvement of Pat Proft:

References

External links
 
 
 
 Finger Lickin' Funny, about the original Kentucky Fried Theater

Jewish American entertainers
Slapstick comedians
Trios
American film directors
Film collectives
American parodists
Parody film directors